The red-collared myzomela (Myzomela rosenbergii) is a species of bird in the family Meliphagidae.
It is found in New Guinea. The long-billed myzomela (M. longirostris) of Goodenough Island was formerly considered conspecific, but was split as a distinct species by the IOC in 2021.

Its natural habitat is subtropical or tropical moist montane forests.

References

red-collared myzomela
Birds of New Guinea
red-collared myzomela
Taxonomy articles created by Polbot